DWEN (100.5 FM), broadcasting as 100.5 Boom Radio, is a radio station owned and operated by Hypersonic Broadcasting Center. Its studios and transmitter are located at Purok 4, LTO Compound, Brgy. Alawihao, Daet.

References

Radio stations in Camarines Norte
Radio stations established in 2015